Estefania Sebastian (born 5 September 1982) is an Andorran sprinter. She competed in the 60 metres event at the 2014 IAAF World Indoor Championships.

References

1982 births
Living people
Andorran female sprinters
Place of birth missing (living people)